Bernardus van Schijndel (1647–1709) was a Dutch Golden Age painter of small scale genre works.

Biography
According to Houbraken, he was a Haarlemmer who lived alongside Reinier (Richard) Brakenburg (1650–1702) in Leeuwarden for a period, where he taught Jelle Sibrandsz, a young painter who later travelled to Italy in 1669.

Though Houbraken wrote that he was the same age, with the same birthplace, and painted in the same style as Brakenburg, he was actually a few years older and was born in Weesp, not Haarlem. He married Lysbet Sanderius in 1677, near Weesp in the town of Diemen, but is registered as living in Leeuwarden from 1671 to 1696. He must have moved to Haarlem sometime after that, which is where he died.

References

Bernardus van Schendel on artnet

1647 births
1709 deaths
Dutch Golden Age painters
Dutch male painters
People from Weesp